This is an inclusive list of science fiction television programs whose names begin with the letter X.

X
Live-action
X-Files, The (franchise) (elements of science fiction in some episodes):
X-Files, The (1993–2002, 2016-2018)
Lone Gunmen, The (2001, X-Files, The spin-off)
Xcalibur (2001)

Animation
X-Bomber (1980–1981, Japan, puppet animation)
X-Men (franchise):
X-Men: Pryde of the X-Men (1989, animated, pilot)
X-Men aka X-Men: The Animated Series (1992–1997, animated)
X-Men: Evolution (2000–2003, animated)
Wolverine and the X-Men (2008–2009, animated)
Marvel Anime: Wolverine (2011, Japan, animated)
Marvel Anime: X-Men (2011, Japan, animated)
Xenosaga: The Animation (2005, Japan, animated)
The X's (2005, animated)
Xyber 9: New Dawn (1999, animated)

References

Television programs, X